Salkımlı is a village in the Yüksekova District of Hakkâri Province in Turkey. The village is populated by Kurds of the Pinyanişi tribe and had a population of 507 in 2021.

The four hamlets of Reşadiye, Köprübaşı, Gülkaymak and Şimte are attached to Salkımlı.

References 

Villages in Yüksekova District
Kurdish settlements in Hakkâri Province